Anvar Abdulakhadovich Zakhidov (born 2 May 1953) is an Uzbek-American physicist from the University of Texas at Dallas.

Career

Born in Tashkent, he worked on superconductors in Japan for five years before immigrating to the United States in 1997, where he joined Honeywell in the private sector. He was installed for his pioneering contributions to the design, fabrication, characterization, and understanding of advanced functional nanomaterials and associated devices, including carbon nanotubes; superconducting and magnetic fullerenes; photonic crystals; solar cells; OLEDs; and cold field emission cathodes.

Awards and recognition

He was awarded the status of Fellow in the American Physical Society after he was nominated by the Division of Materials Physics in 2009.

References 

Living people
1953 births
Scientists from Tashkent
Uzbekistani physicists
American physicists
Uzbekistani emigrants to the United States
Fellows of the American Physical Society
American Physical Society
University of Texas at Dallas faculty